In mathematics, Birkhoff factorization or Birkhoff decomposition, introduced by , is the factorization of an invertible matrix M with coefficients that are Laurent polynomials in z into a product M = M+M0M−, where M+ has entries that are polynomials in z, M0 is diagonal, and M− has entries that are polynomials in z−1.

Birkhoff factorization implies the Birkhoff–Grothendieck theorem of  that vector bundles over the projective line are sums of line bundles.

Birkhoff factorization follows from the Bruhat decomposition for affine Kac–Moody groups (or loop groups), and conversely the Bruhat decomposition for the affine general linear group follows from Birkhoff factorization together with the Bruhat decomposition for the ordinary general linear group.

See also
Birkhoff decomposition (disambiguation)
Riemann–Hilbert problem

References

Matrices